Linnethia Monique "NeNe" Leakes (née Johnson; born December 13, 1967) is an American television personality, actress, presenter, businesswoman, author, and fashion designer. She first rose to prominence after becoming the breakout star on Bravo's reality television series, The Real Housewives of Atlanta.

Born in Queens, New York and raised in Athens, Georgia, she is also known for her recurring character, Roz Washington, on the Fox comedy-drama series Glee.

Leakes also played Rocky Rhoades as a series regular on the sitcom The New Normal on NBC until its cancellation in 2013. She was a participant on NBC's The Celebrity Apprentice and ABC's Dancing with the Stars. Leakes made her Broadway debut as Madame in Rodgers & Hammerstein's Cinderella in 2014, and in 2015, starred as Matron "Mama" Morton in Chicago.

She was one of the regular panelists on ABC's revival of the 1950s game show To Tell the Truth. In addition to her television projects, Leakes had a clothing line on Home Shopping Network, before launching her SWAGG boutiques in select cities across the country.

Early life
Linnethia Monique Johnson was born in Queens, New York City. One of five children, she and one of her brothers were sent to live with an aunt in Athens, Georgia, while the other three children stayed with her mother. It was believed that her mother could not take care of all five. After graduating from Clarke Central High School in Athens, she decided to further her formal education at Morris Brown College in Atlanta for two years before becoming pregnant.

Career
Before Leakes met the producers of The Real Housewives of Atlanta, she had appeared on TV shows like The Parkers thanks to meeting casting director Robi Reed-Humes. In 2003, she landed a minor role as a stripper in the film The Fighting Temptations, starring Cuba Gooding, Jr. and Beyoncé. However, none of her scenes are present in the final edit of the movie.

In 2008, Leakes made her first appearance on The Real Housewives of Atlanta as an original cast member. After the first season, she co-wrote the book Never Make The Same Mistake Twice with Denene Millner. Leakes was a main cast member for the first seven seasons. In June 2015, Leakes announced that she would not be returning to The Real Housewives of Atlanta for its eighth season. However, Leakes was featured in season 8 of The Real Housewives of Atlanta in a supporting role, reportedly earning her full salary from the previous seven seasons. Leakes later returned to the show as a full-time housewife for the tenth through twelfth seasons (2017-20).

In 2020, Leakes announced that she would not return to The Real Housewives of Atlanta for its thirteenth season.

Leakes has also transitioned into scripted television, playing the secretary Rocky Roades in the NBC comedy The New Normal. Ryan Murphy cast Leakes on his series Glee in the third season in a recurring role as synchronized swim coach and Olympic bronze-medalist Coach Roz Washington. In 2011, Leakes was a contestant on the eleventh installment of Donald Trump's NBC series Celebrity Apprentice. During the tenth episode of Celebrity Apprentice, after arguments with fellow cast member Star Jones, Leakes walked off the show.

Leakes has guest-hosted Anderson Live, The Talk, appeared in Betty White's Off Their Rockers and The Price Is Right. On March 4, 2014, she was announced as one of the celebrities who would compete in the 18th season of Dancing with the Stars. She was paired with professional dancer, Tony Dovolani. Leakes and Dovolani were eliminated in Week 7 of competition (Latin Night) on April 28, 2014, finishing in 7th place.

Leakes played the Mistress of Sensuality in Las Vegas for resident show Cirque du Soleil: Zumanity. She made her Broadway debut on November 25, 2014, as Madame in Rodgers & Hammerstein's Cinderella. She played the role until the production closed on January 3, 2015. In November 2015, she was cast as playing Matron "Mama" Morton in Chicago on Broadway for four weeks.

Leakes released a song, entitled "Come and Get This Hunni," in April 2020.

Other ventures

Production
Leakes founded NeNe Leakes Entertainment, a television production company. The company produced Leakes' spin-off series I Dream of NeNe: The Wedding alongside True Entertainment, which premiered on September 17, 2013.

Fashion line
In February 2014, Leakes announced that she would be launching a clothing line later in the year. On July 28, 2014, Leakes launched the Nene Leakes Collection for the Home Shopping Network (HSN).

Comedy
In March 2016, Leakes announced that she would be touring the United States in a one-woman comedy tour called "So Nasty, So Rude," named after one of her catchphrases. The tour started in April, with many shows sold out.

Boutiques 
Leakes opened the first SWAGG Boutique location in Duluth, Georgia in November 2017, and it closed in August 2020. She then expanded SWAGG Boutique to the MGM National Harbor in Maryland and to Miami Beach, with these locations still open and operating.

Lounge 
In October 2020, Leakes posted on Instagram that she would be opening a lounge in Duluth, Georgia. The Linnethia Lounge, named after Leakes' birth name, opened in May 2021. Singers such as KeKe Wyatt and Tamar Braxton have made appearances and performed concerts.

Personal life
Leakes resides in Duluth, Georgia, a suburb of Atlanta. Her home is known as "Casa Leakes". Leakes listed the home for sale in October 2021.

She and husband Gregg Leakes separated in 2010, and she filed for divorce on April 29, 2010. The divorce was finalized September 29, 2011, after season four of The Real Housewives had finished shooting. NeNe and Gregg Leakes reunited and announced that they were engaged in January 2013. Bravo filmed their wedding planning and ceremony for a spin-off entitled I Dream of NeNe: The Wedding. NeNe and Gregg remarried on June 22, 2013, at the InterContinental Buckhead Hotel in Atlanta. In June 2018, she revealed that Gregg had stage 3 colon cancer but announced in May 2019 that he was cancer-free. In June 2021, she announced that the cancer recurred and that he was in the hospital recovering after surgery. Gregg Leakes died from colon cancer on September 1, 2021 at the age of 66.

On April 16, 2022, Leakes filed a federal lawsuit against NBCUniversal, Bravo, production companies True Entertainment and Truly Original, and Real Housewives producer Andy Cohen for violating federal employment and anti-discrimination laws. She dismissed the action and claims on August 19, 2022.

On Monday, October 10, 2022, her son, Brentt, 23, suffered a stroke and congestive heart failure. The cause of these two conditions, which are not usual in someone that young (provided they are otherwise healthy), has not been determined or released, though he has been tested for HIV, which has been known to cause these conditions in individuals of his age range.

Filmography

Film

Television

Music videos

Video games

Producer 

 I Dream of NeNe: The Wedding (TV Series) (executive producer)

Theatre

References

External links

African-American television personalities
Living people
American LGBT rights activists
The Real Housewives of Atlanta
The Real Housewives cast members
21st-century American actresses
American female erotic dancers
American erotic dancers
Actresses from Georgia (U.S. state)
Actresses from New York City
People from Duluth, Georgia
American television actresses
African-American actresses
People from Queens, New York
1967 births
People from Athens, Georgia
The Apprentice (franchise) contestants
21st-century African-American women
21st-century African-American people
20th-century African-American people
20th-century African-American women